A Door Opens (German: Eine Tür geht auf) is a 1933 German thriller film directed by Alfred Zeisler and starring  Hermann Speelmans, Fritz Odemar and Oskar Sima . It was shot at the Babelsberg Studios of UFA in Berlin The film's sets were designed by the art director Otto Hunte.

Synoposis
After a bank robbery in which several hundred thousand reichsmarks are taken, a detective goes on the trail of the five perpetrators responsible.

Cast
 Erika Fiedler as Anni Schubert, Photographin
 Hermann Speelmans as Hans Braumüller
 Lily Rodien as 	Vera Bessel
 Fritz Odemar as 	Jonny Schlichting
 Oskar Sima as 	Franz Zengler
 Hans Deppe as 	Acki
 Peter Erkelenz as 	Julius Kloth
 Walter Steinbeck as 	Karl Bergmann, Bankier
 Curt Lucas as Martin Fichtner, sein Kompagnon
 Hansjoachim Büttner as Kurt Ritter, Bankkassier 
 Ernst Pröckl as Diener bei Bergmann
 Hedy Krilla as 	Die Zimmervermieterin 
 Paul Moleska as 	Müller, Wächter

References

Bibliography
 Klaus, Ulrich J. Deutsche Tonfilme: Jahrgang 1933. Klaus-Archiv, 1988.
 Waldman, Harry. Nazi Films In America, 1933-1942. McFarland & Co, 2008.

External links 
 

1933 films
Films of the Weimar Republic
1930s thriller films
German thriller films
1930s German-language films
German black-and-white films
1930s German films
Films directed by Alfred Zeisler
UFA GmbH films
Films shot at Babelsberg Studios